"Give Me Love" is a song by English singer-songwriter Ed Sheeran. It was released as the sixth and final single from his debut studio album, + (pronounced "Plus"), on 21 November 2012. The song was written by Sheeran, Jake Gosling and Chris Leonard. The single peaked at number 18 on the UK Singles Chart. On the album, Sheeran's cover of the traditional Irish folk song "The Parting Glass" is included at the end as a bonus track. A cover of the song recorded live at the Capital FM Studios in London on 30 May 2014, is featured on the deluxe version of American singer Demi Lovato's fourth album, Demi.

The music video, directed by Emil Nava, features Australian actress Isabel Lucas.

The song was used in episodes of Cougar Town and The Vampire Diaries.

Live performances
On 11 November 2012, Sheeran performed the song on The X Factor results show. On 16 June 2014, Sheeran performed the song as a duet with Demi Lovato at 104.3 MY FM's My Big Night Out event at the Hollywood Bowl in Los Angeles.

Track listing

Charts

Weekly charts

Year-end charts

Certifications

|-

Release history

See also
 List of best-selling singles in Australia

References

External links
 
 
 
 

2012 singles
Ed Sheeran songs
Demi Lovato songs
Songs written by Ed Sheeran
Songs written by Jake Gosling
2011 songs
Warner Music Group singles
Folk ballads
2010s ballads